Josiah Bartlett Jr. (August 29, 1768 – April 16, 1838)  was an American physician and politician from New Hampshire. He served as a United States Representative from New Hampshire and as a member of the New Hampshire Senate during the early 1800s.

Early life
Bartlett was born to Josiah Bartlett and Mary Bartlett in Kingston in the Province of New Hampshire. He followed his father as both a physician and political leader. After graduating from Phillips Exeter Academy in 1784, he studied medicine and started a medical practice in Stratham.

Career
Bartlett was a presidential elector in the 1792 election, supporting George Washington. He served in the State Senate from 1809 to 1810. Elected as a Democratic-Republican candidate, he served as a United States Representative for the state of New Hampshire from March 4, 1811, to March 3, 1813. He was elected a Fellow of the American Academy of Arts and Sciences in 1811. Following his Congressional service, Bartlett resumed the practice of medicine and was elected again to the New Hampshire State Senate, serving from 1824 to 1825. He served as a presidential elector in the 1824 election, supporting John Quincy Adams. He continued the practice of medicine in Stratham.

Personal life
Bartlett died in Stratham, Rockingham County, New Hampshire, on April 16, 1838 (age ). He is interred at Old Congregational Cemetery in Stratham.

Bartlett was the son of Josiah Bartlett, Governor of the state of New Hampshire and signer of the Declaration of Independence.

He married Sarah Ann Wingate on June 3, 1792, and later married Hannah Weeks on April 25, 1812.

References

External links
 
 Josiah Bartlett Family Papers
 

1768 births
1838 deaths
People from Kingston, New Hampshire
American people of English descent
Democratic-Republican Party members of the United States House of Representatives from New Hampshire
1792 United States presidential electors
New Hampshire state senators
Physicians from New Hampshire
People from Stratham, New Hampshire
Phillips Exeter Academy alumni
Fellows of the American Academy of Arts and Sciences